The list of lake and river monsters attested in worldwide folklore.

The list

Gallery

See also

List of cryptids
Underwater panther
Sea monsters

References

Monsters
Water monsters
Lists of legendary creatures